Dockery Hotel was a historic hotel located at Kirksville, Adair County, Missouri. It was built in 1891, and was a two-story, "U"-shaped brick building.  It featured an ornate pressed metal second story front facade with unusual corner columns with enlarged capitals and piers.  It was destroyed in 1991.

It was listed on the National Register of Historic Places in 1983.

References

Hotel buildings on the National Register of Historic Places in Missouri
Hotel buildings completed in 1891
Buildings and structures in Adair County, Missouri
National Register of Historic Places in Adair County, Missouri
1891 establishments in Missouri